Palpita hypomelas is a moth in the family Crambidae. It is found in Papua New Guinea, where it has been recorded from the D'Entrecasteaux Islands (Fergusson Island).

References

H
Endemic fauna of Papua New Guinea
Moths of Papua New Guinea
D'Entrecasteaux Islands
Moths described in 1899